Lloyd Colquitt Glenn (November 21, 1909 – May 23, 1985) was an American R&B pianist, bandleader and arranger, who was a pioneer of the "West Coast" blues style.

Career
Born in San Antonio, Texas, from the late 1920s, Glenn played with various jazz bands in the Dallas and San Antonio areas, first recording in 1936 with Don Albert's Orchestra. He moved to California in 1941, joining the Walter Johnson trio in 1944, and finding employment as a session musician and arranger.  He accompanied T-Bone Walker on his 1947 hit "Call It Stormy Monday", and later the same year made his own first solo records, billed as Lloyd Glenn and His Joymakers.

In 1949 he joined Swing Time Records as A&R man, and recorded a number of hits with Lowell Fulson, including "Everyday I Have the Blues" and the #1 R&B hit "Blue Shadows".  He also had major R&B hits of his own, with "Old Time Shuffle Blues" (#3 U.S. Billboard R&B chart in 1950) being followed by "Chica Boo", which also made #1 on the R&B chart in June 1951.  At the same time, he continued to perform as pianist in Kid Ory's Creole Jazz Band.  Glenn left Ory in 1953, about the same time that he was contracted to Aladdin Records, where he both produced and played on, B.B. King's 1960 album, My Kind of Blues.

He continued working through the 1960s, as both a session musician with King, Walker and others, and as a recording artist in his own right. Towards the end of his career he played at clubs in Los Angeles, performed at the Monterey Jazz Festival, and toured with Clarence "Gatemouth" Brown, Big Joe Turner, and his musician son, Lloyd Glenn Jr.

Glenn died in Los Angeles, California of a heart attack in May 1985.

Discography

With Eddie "Cleanhead" Vinson
The "Clean" Machine (Muse, 1978)
With T-Bone Walker
Stormy Monday Blues (BluesWay, 1968)

References

External links
[  Allmusic.com biography]

1909 births
1985 deaths
Musicians from San Antonio
African-American pianists
American rhythm and blues musicians
American blues pianists
American male pianists
Record producers from Texas
Imperial Records artists
RPM Records (United States) artists
West Coast blues musicians
20th-century American businesspeople
20th-century American pianists
20th-century American male musicians
20th-century African-American musicians